The Asian Infrastructure Investment Bank (AIIB) is a multilateral development bank that aims to improve economic and social outcomes in Asia. It is the world's second largest multi-lateral development institution. The bank currently has 106 members, including 14 prospective members from around the world. The breakdown of the 106 members by continents are as follows: 42 in Asia, 26 in Europe, 21 in Africa, 8 in Oceania, 8 in South America, and 1 in North America. The bank started operation after the agreement entered into force on 25 December 2015, after ratifications were received from 10 member states holding a total number of 50% of the initial subscriptions of the Authorized Capital Stock.

The United Nations has addressed the launch of AIIB as having potential for "scaling up financing for sustainable development" and to improve the global economic governance.

The bank was proposed by China in 2013 and the initiative was launched at a ceremony in Beijing in October 2014. It received the highest credit ratings from the three biggest rating agencies in the world, and is seen as a potential rival to the World Bank and IMF.

History 

The proposal for the creation of an "Asian Infrastructure Investment Bank" was first made by the Vice Chairman of the China Center for International Economic Exchanges, a Chinese thinktank, at the Bo'ao Forum in April 2009. The initial context was to make better use of Chinese foreign currency reserves in the wake of the global financial crisis.

The initiative was officially launched by Chinese leader Xi Jinping on a state visit to Indonesia in October 2013. The Chinese government has been frustrated with what it regards as the slow pace of reforms and governance, and wants greater input in global established institutions like the IMF, World Bank and Asian Development Bank which it claims are heavily dominated by American, European and Japanese interests.

In April 2014, Chinese Premier Li Keqiang delivered a keynote speech at the opening of the Boao Forum for Asia and said that China was ready to intensify consultations with relevant parties in and outside Asia on the preparations for the Asian Infrastructure Investment Bank.

The Asian Development Bank Institute published a report in 2010 which said that the region requires $8 trillion to be invested from 2010 to 2020 in infrastructure for the region to continue economic development. In a 2014 editorial, The Guardian newspaper wrote that the new bank could allow Chinese capital to finance these projects and allow it a greater role to play in the economic development of the region commensurate with its growing economic and political clout. But until March 2015, China in the ADB has only 5.47 percent voting right, while Japan and US have a combined 26 percent voting right (13 percent each) with a share in subscribed capital of 15.7 percent and 15.6 percent, respectively. Dominance by both countries and slow reforms underlie China's wish to establish the AIIB, while both countries worry about China's increasing influence.

In June 2014 China proposed doubling the registered capital of the bank from $50 billion to $100 billion and invited India to participate in the founding of the bank. On 24 October 2014, twenty-one countries signed a Memorandum of Understanding (MOU) regarding the AIIB in Beijing, China: Bangladesh, Brunei, Cambodia, India, Kazakhstan, Kuwait, Laos, Malaysia, Myanmar, Mongolia, Nepal, Oman, Pakistan, Philippines, Qatar, Singapore, Sri Lanka, Thailand, Uzbekistan and Vietnam. Indonesia's joining was slightly delayed due to their new presidential administration not being able to review the membership in time. Indonesia signed the MOU on 25 November 2014.

The U.S. allegedly tried to keep Australia and South Korea from becoming prospective founding members, after they expressed an interest in it. However, both Australia and South Korea applied to join the bank in March 2015.

Hong Kong's Financial Secretary John Tsang announced in his budget speech in February 2015 that the territory would join the AIIB. It did however not become one of the prospective founding members and negotiated as part of the Chinese delegation.

In early March 2015, the United Kingdom's Chancellor of the Exchequer, George Osborne, announced that the UK had decided to apply to join the Bank, becoming the third Western country to do so after Luxembourg and New Zealand. The announcement was criticised by the U.S. Obama Administration. A US government official told Financial Times, "We are wary about a trend toward constant accommodation of China, which is not the best way to engage a rising power." The official further stated that the British decision was taken after "no consultation with the US." In response, the UK indicated that the subject had been discussed between Chancellor Osborne and US Treasury Secretary Jack Lew for several months preceding the decision. It was further stated that joining the bank as a founding member would allow the UK to influence the development of the institution. By encouraging Chinese investments in the next generations of nuclear power plants, Osborne announced that "the City of London would become the base for the first clearing house for the yuan outside Asia."

Following the criticism, the White House National Security Council, in a statement to The Guardian, declared, Our position on the AIIB remains clear and consistent. The United States and many major global economies all agree there is a pressing need to enhance infrastructure investment around the world. We believe any new multilateral institution should incorporate the high standards of the World Bank and the regional development banks. Based on many discussions, we have concerns about whether the AIIB will meet these high standards, particularly related to governance, and environmental and social safeguards […] The international community has a stake in seeing the AIIB complement the existing architecture, and to work effectively alongside the World Bank and Asian Development Bank.

Several other European states – including Germany, France and Italy – followed the UK's decision to join the AIIB in March. German Finance Minister Wolfgang Schäuble stated, "We want to contribute our long-standing experience with international financial institutions to the creation of the new bank by setting high standards and helping the bank to get a high international reputation." In March 2015, the South Korean Ministry of Strategy and Finance announced that it, too, is planning to join the AIIB, citing its potential in helping South Korean companies win deals in infrastructural projects as well expanding South Korea's influence in international banking as a founding member. States could indicate their interest in becoming a Prospective Founding Member until 31 March 2015.

Negotiations took place in the framework of five Chief Negotiators Meetings (CNMs) which took place between November 2014 and May 2015. The Articles of Agreement, the legal framework of the bank, were concluded in the fifth CNM. It was signed on 29 June 2015 by 50 of the named 57 prospective founding members in Beijing, while the other seven signed later.

On 25 December 2015, the Articles of Agreement entered into force. On 16 January 2016, the board of governors of the bank convened its inaugural meeting in Beijing and declared the bank open for business. Jin Liqun was elected as the bank's president for a five-year term. 17 states (Australia, Austria, Brunei, China, Georgia, Germany, Jordan, Luxembourg, Mongolia, Myanmar, the Netherlands, New Zealand, Norway, Pakistan, Singapore, South Korea and the United Kingdom) together holding 50.1% of the initial subscriptions of Authorized Capital Stock, had deposited the instrument of ratification for the agreement, triggering entry into force, and making them all founding members and bringing the Articles of Agreement, the bank's charter, into force. 35 other states followed later, taking the amount of Authorized Capital Stock held by the 29 members of the bank to 74%.

AIIB within PRC policy thinking

Fostering long-term economic development 
The Asian Infrastructure Investment Bank can be construed as a natural inter-national extension of the infrastructure-driven economic development framework that has sustained the rapid economic growth of China since the adoption of the Chinese economic reform under Chinese leader Deng Xiaoping. It stems from the notion that long-term economic growth can only be achieved through systematic, and broad-based investments in infrastructure assets – in contrast with the more short-term "export-driven" and "domestic consumption" development models favored by mainstream Western Neoclassical economists and pursued by many developing countries in the 1990s and the first decade of the 21st century with generally disappointing results.

Infrastructure as regional integration and foreign policy tool 
In his 29 March 2015 speech at the Boao Forum for Asia (BFA) annual conference, Chinese leader Xi Jinping said: [T]he Chinese economy is deeply integrated with the global economy and forms an important driving force of the economy of Asia and even the world at large. […] China's investment opportunities are expanding. Investment opportunities in infrastructure connectivity as well as in new technologies, new products, new business patterns, and new business models are constantly springing up. […] China's foreign cooperation opportunities are expanding. We support the multilateral trading system, devote ourselves to the Doha Round negotiations, advocate the Asia-Pacific free trade zone, promote negotiations on regional comprehensive economic partnership, advocate the construction of the Asian Infrastructure Investment Bank (AIIB), boost economic and financial cooperation in an all-round manner, and work as an active promoter of economic globalization and regional integration.

Xi insisted also that the Silk Road Fund and the Asian Infrastructure Investment Bank would foster "economic connectivity and a new-type of industrialization [in the Asia Pacific area], and [thus] promote the common development of all countries as well as the peoples' joint enjoyment of development fruits."

Academic Suisheng Zhao writes that China's launching of the AIIB was intended by China to reduce tensions caused by the United States' efforts to delay reform of the Bretton Woods system, intended to provide international public goods, and intended to provide China with increased participation in international rule-making.

Legal basis and membership 

The Articles of Agreement form the legal basis for the Bank. 57 Prospective Founding Members (PFM) named in annex A of the agreement are eligible to sign and ratify the Articles, thus becoming a member of the Bank. Other states, which are parties to the International Bank for Reconstruction and Development or the Asian Development Bank may become members after approval of their accession by the bank.

The Articles were negotiated by the Prospective Founding Members, with Hong Kong joining the negotiations via China.

Members 
The 57 Prospective Founding Members can become Founding Members through:
 Signing the Articles of Agreement in 2015
 Ratifying the Articles of Agreement in 2015 or 2016

All Prospective Founding Members have signed the Articles, 52 of which have ratified them, comprising 92% of the shares of all PFM. The formal actions towards becoming a Founding Member are shown below, as well as the percentage of the votes and of the shares, in the event all prospective founding states become parties, and no other members are accepted.

In March 2017, 13 other states were granted prospective membership: 5 regional (Afghanistan, Armenia, Fiji, Timor Leste and Hong Kong, China) and 8 non-regional: Belgium, Canada, Ethiopia, Hungary, Ireland, Peru, Sudan and Venezuela. In May 2017, 7 states were granted prospective membership: 3 regional (Bahrain, Cyprus, Samoa) and 4 non-regional (Bolivia, Chile, Greece, Romania). In June 2017, 3 other states were granted prospective membership: 1 regional (Tonga) and 2 non-regional (Argentina, Madagascar). In 2018, 7 other states were granted prospective membership: 1 regional (Lebanon) and 6 non-regional (Algeria, Ghana, Libya, Morocco, Serbia, Togo). In 2019, 7 other states were granted prospective membership: 7 non-regional (Djibouti, Rwanda, Benin, Côte d'Ivoire, Guinea, Tunisia, Uruguay). They become members after finishing their domestic procedures. As of 8 August 2022, the total number of countries approved for membership of AIIB is 106 (Regional Members: 47, Non-Regional Members: 45, Prospective Members: 14). Countries holding at least 2.0% of either the total subscriptions or voting powers are in bold.

Members

Prospective Members

Dependent territories 
The Articles of Agreement provide for non-sovereign entities to become members of the bank. In addition to the requirements for sovereign states, the membership of dependent territories must be supported by the state responsible for its external relations.

Non-members 
The Czech Republic, Nigeria, Iraq, Colombia, Ukraine are considering joining the AIIB as members. Mexico, Japan and the United States have no immediate intention to participate. Taiwan's request to become a Prospective Founding Member was rejected by China as it does not consider the former to be a sovereign state.

 
 Taiwan applied for PFM to join the AIIB via Taiwan Affairs Office on 31 March, possibly under the name "Chinese Taipei", but was rejected by the Multilateral Interim Secretariat of the AIIB on 13 April, without any reason stated. However, mainland China claims that there is the possibility for Taiwan to obtain membership at a later date. Foreign Ministry spokeswoman Hua Chunying said that Taiwan should avoid creating a "two Chinas" or "one China, one Taiwan" situation. ROC Finance Minister Chang Sheng-ford announced in April 2016 that Taiwan was not being treated with "dignity" or "respect" during the registration process and Taiwan eventually chose to leave the decision to join to the new president.

 United States – No commitment
 The United States' officials have expressed concerns about whether the AIIB would have high standards of governance, and whether it would have environmental and social safeguards. The United States is reported to have used diplomatic pressure to try and prevent key allies, such as Australia, from joining the bank, and expressed disappointment when others, such as Britain, joined. The US' opposition to the AIIB, as well as its attempt to dissuade allies from joining was seen as a manifestation of a multifaceted containment strategy.

 Japan – "Under Consideration" / No commitment
 Masato Kitera, Tokyo's envoy in Beijing, stated previously that Japan might join the AIIB. Japanese Finance Minister Tarō Asō previously indicated interest in joining the AIIB, but later switched his stance. Yoshihide Suga, Japan's Cabinet Secretary, told the public that Japan was still seeking China's full explanation of the AIIB as he stated, "As of today, Japan will not join AIIB and a clear explanation has not been received from China" and "Japan is dubious about whether (the AIIB) would be properly governed or whether it would damage other creditors". He also stated that Japan is no longer considering whether or not to join the bank. The Japanese Government Spokesman also announced that Japan would not join the AIIB. Japanese prime minister Shinzō Abe also added that Japan does not need to join the bank. But two years later, in May 2017, Shinzō Abe said joining the AIIB, created in part to fund the initiative, could be an option if governance questions were resolved. Toshihiro Nikai, secretary-general of the ruling party Liberal Democratic Party, suggested joining the AIIB.

Shareholding structure 
The Authorized Capital Stock of the bank is $100 billion (US dollars), divided into 1 million shares of $100,000 each. Twenty percent are paid-in shares (and thus have to be transferred to the bank), and 80% are callable shares. The allocated shares are based on the size of each member country's economy (calculated using GDP Nominal (60%) and GDP PPP (40%)) and whether they are an Asian or Non-Asian Member. The total number of shares will determine the fraction of authorized capital in the bank. Of the prospective founding members, three states decided not to subscribe to all allocated shares: Malaysia, Portugal, and Singapore, resulting in 98% of available shares being subscribed.

Three categories of votes exist: basic votes, share votes and Founding Member votes. The basic votes are equal for all members and constitute 12% of the total votes, while the share votes are equal to the number of shares. Each Founding Member furthermore gets 600 votes. An overview of the shares, assuming when all 57 Prospective Founding Members have become Founding Members is shown below (values in bold do not depend on the number of members):

Governance 

The bank's governance structure is composed of the Board of Governors as the top-level and highest decision-making body. It is composed of 1 governor for each member state of the bank and in principle meets once a year. The board of directors, composed of 12 governors, each representing one or more member is responsible for daily operations and tasks delegated to it by the board of governors. Nine of those members are from within the Asia-Pacific region and three representing members outside the region.

Of the non-regional directors, 1 constituency is made up of EU member states having the Euro as their currency, and 1 from other European countries.

New members are considered for admission only once a year. An overview of the constituencies is shown below:

Reception 

The former President of the World Bank, Jim Yong Kim, has said that the need for infrastructure in developing countries is great so that the activities of new organizations would be welcome. The World Bank, IMF, and Asian Development bank have all cooperated with the AIIB as a compliment to the Bretton Woods institutions and which further increases overall capacity for development funds.

Economist C. Fred Bergsten describes the AIIB as "helping meet a clear need for more infrastructure funding throughout Asia (and elsewhere)." He concludes that the AIIB "has adhered to internationally agreed norms and best practices, and is innovating some of its own[.]" Additionally, Bergsten writes that China's role in the AIIB "has clearly met the U.S. request for China to function as a 'responsible stakeholder' in the world economy."

Geopolitical implication in Asia-Pacific and beyond 

There is no consensus in the United States about the role of the AIIB. John Ikenberry sees the AIIB as part of "China's emerging institutional statecraft," but argues that it is not clear whether the institution will tie China more deeply into the existing order or become a vehicle to challenge the order.  Phillip Lipscy (Stanford University) argues that the United States and Japan should support the AIIB to encourage China's peaceful global leadership and discourage China from pursuing coercive or military options. On the other hand, Paola Subacchi (Chatham House) argues that the AIIB represents a threat to US-dominated global governance.

Think-tanks such as Chatham House, the China Studies Centre at the University of Sydney and the World Pensions Council (WPC) have argued that the successful establishment of a new supranational financial powerhouse headquartered in PRC would be facilitated by the large number of participating developed economies. These experts observe that the establishment of the Beijing-based AIIB does not necessitate rivalry, when economic cooperation is possible, and that the decision by the UK to participate advances its own interests even if some of its allies are opposed.

Environmental record 
Although the proposed bank declared "AIIB will learn from the best practice in the world and adopt international standards of environmental protection," Oxford scholar of economics and energy policy Yuge Ma has argued that this may be complicated in developing Asian countries.

Comparison with ADB and IBRD

Lending results

2016
During 2016, AIIB committed a total of $1.73 billion to nine projects, among which six projects are joint initiatives with other international lenders such as the World Bank and the Asian Development Bank. It had achieved its loan target of $1.2 billion for the first year.

2017

2018

2019

2020

See also 

 New Development Bank (BRICS)/NDB BRICS
 Asian Development Bank
 African Development Bank
 Caribbean Development Bank
 CAF - Development Bank of Latin America
 European Investment Bank
 Inter-American Development Bank
 Islamic Development Bank

Notes

References

External links 

 
 Articles of Agreement of the Bank, and Report on the Articles

 
Banks established in 2014
International development multilaterals
Multilateral development banks
Belt and Road Initiative
Supranational banks